Micromonospora profundi is a bacterium from the genus Micromonospora which has been isolated from deep marine sediments from the Black Sea.

References

 

Micromonosporaceae
Bacteria described in 2016